Robert Fred Kercher (January 14, 1918 – January 4, 2004) was an American football defensive end in the National Football League who played for the Green Bay Packers.  Kercher played collegiate ball for Georgetown University and played professionally in the NFL for 1 season, in 1944.

References

1918 births
2004 deaths
Sportspeople from Evansville, Indiana
Players of American football from Indiana
American football defensive ends
Georgetown Hoyas football players
Green Bay Packers players
Wilmington Clippers players